2456 Palamedes  is a large Jupiter trojan from the Greek camp, approximately  in diameter. It was discovered on 30 January 1966, by astronomers at the Purple Mountain Observatory in Nanking, China. The assumed C-type asteroid has a rotation period of 7.24 hours and belongs to the 50 largest Jupiter trojans. It was named after Palamedes from Greek mythology.

Orbit and classification 

Palamedes is a dark Jovian asteroid orbiting in the leading Greek camp at Jupiter's  Lagrangian point, 60° ahead of the Gas Giant's orbit in a 1:1 resonance (see Trojans in astronomy). It is also a non-family asteroid in the Jovian background population.

It orbits the Sun at a distance of 4.7–5.5 AU once every 11 years and 7 months (4,244 days; semi-major axis of 5.13 AU). Its orbit has an eccentricity of 0.07 and an inclination of 14° with respect to the ecliptic. The body's observation arc begins with a precovery taken at Palomar Observatory in February 1953, nearly 13 years prior to its official discovery observation at Nanking.

Naming 

This minor planet was named from Greek mythology after Palamedes, the most intelligent of all the Greek commanders of the Trojan War. The official naming citation was published by the Minor Planet Center on 28 January 1983.

Physical characteristics 

Palamedes is an assumed carbonaceous C-type asteroid.

Rotation period 

In August 1995, a rotational lightcurve of Palamedes was obtained from photometric observations by Stefano Mottola and Hans-Josef Schober using the now decommissioned Bochum 0.61-metre Telescope at ESO's La Silla Observatory in Chile. Lightcurve analysis gave a rotation period of  hours and a brightness variation of 0.05 magnitude.

A more refined period of  hours with an amplitude of 0.27 magnitude was obtained by Robert Stephens at the Goat Mountain Astronomical Research Station  in October 2009.

Diameter and albedo 

According to the surveys carried out by the Japanese Akari satellite, the Infrared Astronomical Satellite IRAS, and the NEOWISE mission of NASA's Wide-field Infrared Survey Explorer, Palamedes measures between 65.92 and 99.60 kilometers in diameter and its surface has an albedo between 0.026 and 0.071. The Collaborative Asteroid Lightcurve Link derives an albedo of 0.0399 and a diameter of 91.83 kilometers based on an absolute magnitude of 9.3.

References

External links 
 Asteroid Lightcurve Database (LCDB), query form (info )
 Dictionary of Minor Planet Names, Google books
 Discovery Circumstances: Numbered Minor Planets (1)-(5000) – Minor Planet Center
 
 

002456
002456
Named minor planets
19660130